Junior Baometu Moke (born 9 May 1994) is a Congolese football defender who plays for DC Motema Pembe.

References 

1994 births
Living people
Democratic Republic of the Congo footballers
Democratic Republic of the Congo international footballers
Association football defenders
AS Vita Club players
FC Saint-Éloi Lupopo players
Daring Club Motema Pembe players
21st-century Democratic Republic of the Congo people
2016 African Nations Championship players
Democratic Republic of the Congo A' international footballers